is a junior college in Tokyo, Japan, and is part of the Aoyama Gakuin network.

The institute was founded in 1874 by Dora E. Schoonmaker, an American missionary sent to Japan by the Women's Foreign Missionary Society of the Methodist Episcopal Church.

External links
 official website 
A Brief History- Aoyama Gakuin Women's Junior College

Educational institutions established in 1874
Japanese junior colleges
Universities and colleges in Tokyo
1874 establishments in Japan